Hip Mama: The Parenting Zine is an American Alternative Press Award-winning quarterly periodical covering the culture and politics of parenting. The magazine is widely credited with launching the contemporary mothers' movement.

The first issue of Hip Mama was published in December, 1993, in Oakland, California, by the founding editor Ariel Gore as a forum for single, urban and feminist mothers. Gore edited Hip Mama for 15 years. Hip Mama relaunches in 2014 with expanded food, arts, and political coverage. The magazine is now published in the East Bay.

References

External links

Ariel Gore's website

1993 establishments in Oregon
Alternative magazines
Quarterly magazines published in the United States
Magazines established in 1993
Magazines published in Portland, Oregon
Parenting magazines